The discography of Canadian R&B recording artist Melanie Fiona comprises two studio album and 12 singles.

Fiona's debut album The Bridge was released in 2009; she collaborated with Future Cut, Vada Nobles, Stereotypes, J. Phoenix and Peter Wade Keusch. The debut single "Give It to Me Right" was sent to radio stations on February 28, 2009, and peaked at number 20 on the Canadian Hot 100 chart and number 41 on the UK Singles Chart. The second single, "It Kills Me", became her breakout song on the Billboard Hot 100, where it entered the Top 50, along with topping the Hot R&B/Hip-Hop Songs chart. The song earned Fiona a Grammy Award nomination for Best Female R&B Vocal Performance. The Bridge also earned her a NAACP Image Award nomination for Outstanding New Artist. In 2012, Fiona won two Grammy Awards for Best Traditional R&B Performance for the song "Fool for You" with CeeLo Green.

In 2011, Hallim began recording her second studio album. The lead single was entitled "Gone and Never Coming Back". The single peaked at 37 on the US R&B chart, becoming her second highest peaking song on the R&B chart so far. Later that year, Fiona released her second single, "4 AM"; it was sent to urban stations on August 30, 2011. "4 AM" peaked on the US R&B chart at #8; the song was about a lover who had gone out and was cheating on her. She released her second studio album The MF Life on March 20, 2012.

Albums

Studio albums

Singles

As lead artist

Promotional singles

As featured artist

Notes
 A  "Sad Songs" was released in the UK only as a digital EP before the release of "Give It To Me Right". The three-song EP also contained the reggae-tinged songs "Somebody Come Get Me" and "Island Boy", both produced by Supa Dups.

Guest appearances

Music videos

As lead artist

As featured artist

References

Discographies of Canadian artists